Liam Toland (born 18 June 1972) is an Irish former rugby union player and current analyst.

Career
Toland's Munster career began in the mid-1990s, but a career threatening injury sustained whilst playing in the All-Ireland League with Old Crescent in 1997 forced him to take time out of the game, until Mike Ruddock brought him to Leinster in 1999, for whom Toland continued to represent until 2003.

Aside from rugby, Toland was also a captain in the Irish Defence Forces between 1991 and 2009, a rugby analyst with Setanta Sports, a rugby analyst for the Irish Times, founder and CEO of Tap and Test, and owner of Home Instead Senior Care. In 2001, Toland and Peter McKenna set up the Irish Rugby Union Players Association, with Toland being appointed the organisations inaugural chairman. He left the role in 2003 to make way for a full-time appointment.

References

External links
Munster Profile

Leinster Profile
Liam Toland at LinkedIn
Liam Toland at The Irish Times
Liam Toland Twitter

Living people
1972 births
Rugby union players from Limerick (city)
Irish rugby union players
Munster Rugby players
Leinster Rugby players
Rugby union flankers
Rugby union number eights